"Why (Must We Fall in Love)" is a Diana Ross & the Supremes and The Temptations song released in 1970 as the second single from the album Together. While the album's preceding single, "The Weight" was only released in the US and Canada, "Why (Must We Fall in Love)" was not released in North America, but was released as a single in the United Kingdom, peaking at 31 on the charts. The UK single hit the charts in March 1970, three months after Ross had left the Supremes.

Chart history

Personnel
Lead vocals by Diana Ross and Eddie Kendricks
Background vocals by The Supremes and The Temptations
Instrumentation by various Los Angeles area session musicians

References

1970 songs
1970 singles
The Supremes songs
The Temptations songs
Songs written by Deke Richards